In the Tuamotu Rata cycle, Tahiti-tokerau was a water-nymph whom Vahi-vero marries.  She was abducted by Puna, king of the underworld and rescued by her husband. They then become parents of Rata.

See also
Rata (Tuamotu mythology)
Rātā (Māori mythology)
Laka (Hawaiian and other Polynesian mythology)

References
R.D. Craig, Dictionary of Polynesian Mythology (Greenwood Press: New York, 1989), 251; 
J.F. Stimson, Tuamotuan Legends: Island of Anaa (Honolulu: Bernice P. Bishop Museum Press, 1937), 96-100.

Tuamotu mythology
Polynesian legendary creatures